Anne Poiret (born December 6, 1976) is a French journalist and documentary filmmaker. She won the 2007 Albert Londres Prize and the 2022 International Emmy Awards for best documentary. She is an expert in topics related to war and post-war situations.

Education 
After completing a B.A. in history from the University of Paris X Nanterre, Anne Poiret studied at the Paris Institute of Political Studies. She graduated in 1999 and the following year completed coursework toward a master's degree in journalism at New York University.

Career 
Poiret has worked for various editorial offices and news magazines, including "C dans l’air" on France 5, "Envoyé Spécial" on France 2, as well as "Arte reportage" on Arte. She writes and directs documentaries about topics such as: aftermath of armed conflicts, human and political consequences of wars, and actions of the United Nations and other international non-governmental organizations.

Her first film, Muttur: Crime against Humanitarians,  investigates the unsolved murder of 17 humanitarian workers in Sri Lanka. It earned the prestigious Albert Londres Prize.

Many of her subsequent films focus on countries going through postwar reconstruction, such as Iraq and the Republic of South Sudan. She has also investigated the genocide of the Herero and Namas in Namibia, as well as the situation in the regions of Donbass, Kashmir, and Syria.

Much of Poiret's work questions the actions of public authorities and international companies (e.g. Epidemics: the invisible threat, Welcome to Refugeestan or My country makes weapons).

Her documentaries are usually released first on French public television network; many are subsequently broadcast on European, Canadian, Australian, Japanese and the Middle Eastern TV channels.

One of her most recent documentaries, Iraq’s Lost Generation, won the 2022 International Emmy Awards for best documentary.

Documentaries 
 2007: Muttur: a Crime Against Humanitarians
 2012: Namibia, the Genocide of the Second Reich
 2013: State Builders
 2014: Epidemics, the Invisble Threat
 2015: Libya: the Impossible Nation State
 2016: Cachemire, au cœur d'une poudrière
 2016: Welcome to Refugeestan 
 2017: The Envoy, Inside Syria peace negotiations
 2018: My Country Makes Weapons
 2019: Mosul After the War
 2021: Iraq’s Lost Generation 
 2022: Ukraine, the Road to War

Iraq's lost generation 
Her Emmy-nominated documentary, Iraq's Lost Generation, focuses on the “Cubs of the Caliphate” a generation of young and forgotten victims of the war against the Islamic State. These are the children of families who had pledged allegiance to the caliphate and are now denied any legal existence. 

The film was sold on 20 networks including Al Jazeera English, BBC Arabic and NHK. It has already received multiple awards, including the 2022 International Emmy Awards for best documentary.

Books 
 L'ultime tabou: Femmes pédophiles, Femmes incestueuses, Éditions Patrick Robin, 19 janvier 2006, 189 pages
 Mon pays vend des armes, Éditions Les Arènes, Coll. AR.Enquêtes, 15 mai 2019, 297 pages,

Awards 
 2007:  Albert-Londres award for Muttur: A crime against Humanitarian
 2013: Special Jury Award at Watch Doc human rights in film Warsaw for State Builders 
 2013: Etoile de la scam for Namibia, the genocide of the second Reich
 2021:  Special mention at MoveIT Festival Dresden
 2017: Étoile de la Scam Prize 2017 for Welcome to Refugeestan  
 2020: Special Jury award FIGRA for Mosul after the war
 2021: Special merit award UNICEF Innocenti Film Festival (UIFF) for Iraq‘s lost generation
 2022: Best documentary shot abroad Enfance Majuscule award
 2022: Audience Award at Figra
 2022: International Emmy awards for Iraq’s lost generation

References 

1976 births
Living people
Albert Londres Prize recipients
French journalists
French journalism awards
French women film directors
French women journalists
Sciences Po alumni